The wooden churches of southern Lesser Poland of the UNESCO inscription are located in Binarowa, Blizne, Dębno, Haczów, Lipnica Murowana, and Sękowa (Lesser Poland Voivodeship or Małopolska). There are in fact many others of the region which fit the description: "The wooden churches of southern Little Poland represent outstanding examples of the different aspects of medieval church-building traditions in Roman Catholic culture. Built using the horizontal log technique, common in eastern and northern Europe since the Middle Ages..."

The wooden church style of the region originated in the late Medieval, the late sixteenth century, and began with Gothic ornament and polychrome detail, but because they were timber construction, the structure, general form, and feeling is entirely different from the gothic architecture or Polish Gothic (in stone or brick).  Later construction show Rococo and Baroque ornamental influence. The form of these Roman Catholic churches is deeply influenced by the Greco-Catholic and Orthodox presence in the region.  Some display Greek cross plans and onion domes, but the most interesting of the churches combine these features with the Roman forms with elongated naves and steeples. Other collections of wooden churches of the region are in the open-air museums in Sanok and Nowy Sącz.

St. Michael Archangel's Church, Binarowa

All Saints Church, Blizne

St. Michael Archangel's Church, Dębno

Assumption of Holy Mary Church, Haczów

St. Leonard's Church, Lipnica Murowana

Saints Philip and James Church, Sękowa

Other wooden churches of the region

See also 

 Wooden churches in Ukraine
 Carpathian Wooden Churches
 Vernacular architecture of the Carpathians
 Wooden Churches of Maramureş
 St. George's Church, Drohobych
 Kryvka Church
 Wooden synagogues of the former Polish-Lithuanian Commonwealth
 Zakopane Style architecture
 Lesser Poland

References

 UNESCO citation
  The Wooden Architecture Route in Małopolska
 Regional Uniate Church history
Oldest wooden church at Czech Republic from 1177

Churches in Lesser Poland Voivodeship

Churches in Podkarpackie Voivodeship
World Heritage Sites in Poland
Wooden buildings and structures in Poland